Area 27 of Brodmann-1909 is a cytoarchitecturally defined cortical area that is a rostral part of the parahippocampal gyrus. It is commonly regarded as a synonym of presubiculum.

The dorsal part of the presubiculum is more commonly known as the postsubiculum and is of interest because it contains head direction cells, which are responsive to the facing direction of the head.

See also

 Brodmann area
 List of regions in the human brain

References

External links
 For Neuroanatomy of this area visit BrainInfo

27
Medial surface of cerebral hemisphere